The 2017 FC Okzhetpes season is the 3rd successive season, and 20th in total, that the club playing in the Kazakhstan Premier League, the highest tier of association football in Kazakhstan. Okzhetpes will also participate in the Kazakhstan Cup.

On 17 May, Vladimir Mukhanov resigned as manager, with Viktor Semenov taking  temporary charge, until Viktor Pasulko was appointed as the club's new manager on 25 May.

Squad

Transfers

Winter

In:

Out:

Summer

In:

Out:

Competitions

Kazakhstan Premier League

Results summary

Results by round

Results

League table

Kazakhstan Cup

Squad statistics

Appearances and goals

|-
|colspan="14"|Players away from Okzhetpes on loan:
|-
|colspan="14"|Players who left Okzhetpes during the season:

|}

Goal scorers

Disciplinary record

References

External links
 

FC Okzhetpes seasons
Okzhetpes